Algimantas Adolfas Jucys (14 November 1936 – 29 July 1997) was a Lithuanian theoretical physicist  more prominent as a  mathematician, a son of Lithuanian physicist Adolfas Jucys. Since 1967 Algis Jucys was researcher at the Institute of Physics and Mathematics of Lithuanian Academy of Sciences, in 1977-1990 at the Institute of Physics and in 1990-1996 at the Institute of Theoretical Physics and Astronomy, Lithuania.

Algimantas (Algis) Adolfas (A.-A.A.) Jucys was member of Lithuanian Physical Society, Lithuanian Mathematical Society, American Mathematical Society. Jucys–Murphy elements in the group algebra  of the symmetric group are named after him.

References

1936 births
1997 deaths
Vilnius University alumni
Lithuanian physicists
20th-century Lithuanian mathematicians